Pal is a village in Andorra, located in the parish of La Massana 4 km west of the town of La Massana, close to the border with Spain at Tor, Pallars. Its population, as of 2013, was of 235.

Overview
It is situated at an altitude of 1,551 m (5,089 ft). The village church, of the 11th century and in Romanesque style, is dedicated to St. Clement. It has a rectangular bell tower with mullioned windows decorated. Above the town, in the forest of Pal, in 1982 was inaugurated the ski resort of Pal, now grouped with the Arinsal ski area forming the Vallnord.

A legend says that Pal was discovered  by a man of Riberaygua family. That man was called Bonaventura Riberaygua and he changed his surname in Pal-Riberaygua.

References

Populated places in Andorra
La Massana